Clinical & Experimental Allergy is a monthly journal dedicated to the field of allergy. The official journal of the British Society for Allergy & Clinical Immunology (BSACI), it has been in publication since 1971. A subscription to the journal is included with BSACI membership, but the journal is also available to other subscribers.

External links
Journal homepage 
The British Society for Allergy and Clinical Immunology

Biology journals
Publications established in 1971
Wiley-Blackwell academic journals